Siboney is a Mexican-Cuban drama film directed by Juan Orol. It was filmed in 1938 and released in 1942 and starring María Antonieta Pons and Juan Orol.

Plot
In 1868, while develops the Cuban War of Independence, Gaston de Montero (Juan Orol), a noble Spanish knight, rescues a young girl named Siboney (María Antonieta Pons) and he helps her to become in a successful dancer. Over time, she discovers that she is the daughter of a prominent aristocrat.

Cast
 María Antonieta Pons ... Siboney
 Juan Orol ... Gastón de Montero
 Chela Castro ... Caridad
 Luisa María Morales ... Ligia
 Oscar Lombardo ... Ricardo
 Celina ... Santerian

Reviews
Siboney is the first film by the Spanish director Juan Orol with his second film muse, María Antonieta Pons. With Mexican production, the film was shot in Cuba, inspired by the theme song Siboney of Ernesto Lecuona. For this film  were used scenes of the Galician Center of Havana. The motto of this film was a distinct Cuban film. Siboney was considered the first film of the called Rumberas film of the Golden Age of Mexican cinema.

References

External links
 
 El Veraz: María Antonieta Pons: The Queen of the Tropics

1942 films
1940s historical films
Mexican black-and-white films
Mexican historical films
Rumberas films
1940s Spanish-language films
Films directed by Juan Orol
Films set in the 19th century
Cuban historical films
Cuban black-and-white films
1940s Mexican films